West Richmond is a small residential suburb of Adelaide, on Kaurna land in the City of West Torrens.

The suburb rests East of the Adelaide Airport. This small suburb has a small shopping village including a TAB betting venue, a café, a liquor store and newly built McDonalds and Hungry Jacks stores competing alongside each other.

References

Suburbs of Adelaide